(Not to be confused with Ruhollah Khomeini who was the leader of the 1979 Iranian revolution)

Ruhollah Khatami (28 October 1906 – 27 October 1988) was a senior Iranian cleric in the city of Yazd.

In July 1982, he was appointed as prayer leader in the central Iranian city of Yazd by Ruhollah Khomeini. He is the father of a number of notable Iranian politicians, including former president Mohammad Khatami, Islamic Iran Participation Front founder Mohammad-Reza Khatami, former presidential chief of staff Ali Khatami and Fatemeh Khatami, who was elected to Ardakan's city council in 1999.

References

1906 births
1988 deaths
Iranian ayatollahs
20th-century Iranian politicians
People from Yazd
Mohammad Khatami